Peter G. Mirto (April 13, 1915 – March 5, 2001) was an American politician who served in the New York State Assembly from 1969 to 1978.

He died on March 5, 2001, in Glen Cove, New York at age 85.

References

1915 births
2001 deaths
Democratic Party members of the New York State Assembly
20th-century American politicians